Paul Hartmut Würdig (born 30 November 1980), better known as Sido, is a German rapper. He interprets his artist name as "super-intelligentes Drogenopfer" (super-intelligent drug victim). It used to stand for "Scheiße in dein Ohr" (shit into your ear), a line from his track "Terroarr".

Sido distinguishes himself by using provocative and aggressive lyrics. After his breakthrough with his debut album Maske in 2004, he was always seen wearing a silver skull mask. However, since 2005, he no longer wears the mask.

Würdig's career began in 1997, as one half of duo Royal TS (now A.i.d.S) with B-Tight, both of whom were later signed to the label Berlin hip hop Royal Bunker and then to Aggro Berlin in 2001. As of 2009, Sido is signed to Urban/Universal Music Group.

Early life
Würdig was born to a German father and a Sinti mother. At the age of eight, he and his younger sister were brought up by their mother in East Berlin in the Prenzlauer Berg neighborhood. In 1988, the family moved to West Berlin, where they first lived in emergency accommodation in Wedding along with many asylum seekers. They then moved into Märkisches Viertel, a high-rise residential area in the Berlin borough of Reinickendorf. During his childhood and youth, Märkisches Viertel had a high proportion of migrants and low-income families. There he attended the Bettina-von-Arnim-Oberschule and afterwards began an apprenticeship as an educator, which he never completed.

Career

1997–2002: Early career
Sido has been active in the music business since 1997. Together with his best friend B-Tight he released several EPs and demos under the name Royal TS, which were never officially published, at the Berlin underground hip hop label Royal Bunker. Sido had been friends with DJ Tomekk for a long time. The two made a dubplate from Arschficksong and DJ Tomekk played them in clubs all over Germany, presenting Sido to a wider audience for the first time. Specter was art director for DJ Tomekk at that time. At a concert the duo got the attention of Halil, Specter and Spaiche - the later founders of the Aggro Berlin label.

2003–2004: First successes and Maske

Sido's solo career began in 2002 with the "Arschficksong" ("Ass-fuck song") on the sampler Aggro Ansage Nr. 1 and the "Weihnachtssong" ("Christmas song") on Aggro Ansage Nr. 3.

In 2004, Sido's debut album Maske was released, reaching No. 3 on the German charts and selling more than 180,000 copies to date, achieving gold status. The lead single "Mein Block" ("My hood") reached No. 13 on the German charts, the second single "Fuffies im Club" ("€50 notes in the club") reached No. 18 and the third single "Mama ist stolz" ("Mum is proud") reached No. 25. The original album was banned because of the song "Endlich Wochenende" ("Finally weekend") which, according to the Federal Department for Media Harmful to Young Persons, glorified the use of drugs. The album was rereleased under the name "Maske X" with the song "Arschficksong" in replacement of "Endlich Wochenende". The song was also published (with the video slightly censored), for the first time as a single.

In September of the same year, he won a prestigious German music award for "Best Newcomer." The best-known song from that album, "Mein Block", describes life from a resident's perspective in the Märkisches Viertel, a low-income neighborhood of Berlin, detailing the narcotics trade, alcoholism, problems with police, and poverty in Sido's Block, or building.

2005–2006: Other projects and Ich

After this debut album, together with his Label colleagues B-Tight and Fler, he released two label samplers: Aggro Ansage Nr. 4 and Aggro Ansage Nr. 5 (which featured the new label artists Tony D and G-Hot).

Later he collaborated with rapper Harris, as the rap duo Deine Lieblings Rapper ("Your favorite rappers"). In 2005, they released their debut album Dein Lieblings Album ("Your favorite album"), with "Steh wieder auf" ("Get up again") as the only single.

In December 2006, Sido released his second album Ich, which reached No. 4 in the German album charts. Three singles ("Strassenjunge", "Ein Teil von mir" and "Schlechtes Vorbild") were released. The album achieved gold status.

2007: Sektenmusik
In 2007, Sido and B-Tight (alias A.i.d.S.) formed their label Sektenmuzik and a rap-crew named Die Sekte (with Rhymin Simon and Vokalmatador). Tony D joined later.

2008: Ich und meine Maske and Popstars
His third album Ich und meine Maske was released at the end of May 2008. It reached No. 1 in the German album charts. The singles "Augen auf"/Halt dein Maul", "Carmen", "Herz", "Nein!" and "Beweg dein Arsch" had success in the charts.

In August 2008, Sido joined the seventh season of Popstars, called "Just 4 Girls", as a jury member, along with Detlef D! Soost and Loona. Many people were surprised, wondering why Sido, the rapper with his provocative and aggressive lyrics, would join a TV show like Popstars.
At the end of Popstars, the band Queensberry was formed.

2009: Aggro Berlin
On 1 April 2009, the label Aggro Berlin was closed. Sido was then signed by Urban Records, a division of Universal Music Germany.

On 30 October 2009, Sido released his fourth studio album Aggro Berlin. The lead single "Hey du!" ranked No. 4 in the German Charts. In this song Sido talks about growing up in East Germany and his later life in West Berlin. He reported that he kept his East Berlin origins secret for a long time for fear of bullying.

Personal life

Würdig has a son, whose name and date of birth are not known publicly, but he references him in the songs "Aggro Gold" and "2010", amongst others.

He began dating former Nu Pagadi lead singer Doreen Steinert in mid-2005 and on 14 February 2010 they became engaged. But in April 2012 they broke off their engagement. Just a few weeks later, in early May 2012, Würdig confirmed rumors that he had started dating German TV presenter Charlotte Engelhardt. Sido had a second son with Engelhardt in 2013.

Würdig is the second cousin of the German DSDS participant Menowin Fröhlich.

Controversy
The perceived rebellious tendencies of Sido's label affiliates B-Tight, Fler, and G-Hot, whose persona emphasize embittered racial or class standpoints, have garnered additional discussion in widely circulated publications.

MTV HipHop Open
July 2004, Sido performed live in Stuttgart for the festival MTV HipHop Open. During his performances he insulted Frankfurt rapper Azad's mother saying: "If we had a bed right here, I'd bang Azad's mother". A week later Sido and Azad met each other backstage, and after a short dispute, it escalated into a brawl that involved the artists of Aggro Berlin and Bozz Music. The security and the police arrived to stop the conflict, but Azad and his crew had fled already.

Discography

Studio albums
 Maske (2004)
 Ich (2006)
 Ich und meine Maske (2008)
 Aggro Berlin (2009)
 30.11.80 (2013)
 VI (2015)
 Das goldene Album (2016)
 Ich & keine Maske (2019)

Live albums
 MTV Unplugged Live aus'm MV (arranged and produced by Sven Helbig) (2010)

Collaborations
 Dein Lieblingsalbum (with Deine Lieblingsrapper) (2005)
 Die Sekte (with Die Sekte) (2009)
 23 (with Bushido) (2011)
 Crystals (with Eskimo Callboy) (2015)
 Royal Bunker (with Kool Savas) (2017)

Soundtrack
 Blutzbrüdaz – Die Mukke zum Film (with various artists) (2011)

Compilation
 No. Beste (2012)
 Kronjuwelen (2018)

Filmography

Awards and certifications
 2004: Bravo Otto in Gold in the category "National rapper"
 2004: Comet in the category "National Newcomer"
 2006: Bravo Otto in silver in the category "Best Rapper National" (Sido)
 2006: Juice-Awards: 1st place in the category "Album National" for "Ich"
 2007: Golden Tape for 15 No. 1 rankings "Strassenjunge" in the video on MTV's TRL
 2007: Bravo Otto in silver in the category "National Hip-Hop"
 2009: Swiss Music Award in the category "Best Urban Album International"
 2009: Comet in the category "Best Song"
 2010: Echo in the category "Best Video" for "Hey Du"!
 2010: Comet in the category "Best Song"
 2010: MTV Europe Music Award in the category Best German Act
 2011: Comet in the category "Best Artist"
 2012: Echo-winner in the category Bestes Video National for So mach ich es'' with Bushido

Gold Record
Germany
 2004: for the album "Maske"
 2004: for the sampler "Aggro Ansage Nr. 4"
 2005: for the sampler "Aggro Ansage Nr. 5"
 2006: for the album "Ich"
 2011: for the album "Ich und meine Maske"
 2012: for the album "23"
 2013: for the single "Der Himmel soll warten"
Austria
 2008: for the album "Ich und meine Maske"
 2011: for the album "23"
 2012: for the album "Blutzbrüdaz - die Mukke zum Film"
Switzerland
 2008: for the album "Ich und meine Maske"

Platinum Record
 Switzerland
 2009: for the album "Ich und meine Maske"

Literature

References

External links

 Official website 
 aggroberlin.de 
 Biography of Sido on laut.de 
 
  

Echo (music award) winners
German autobiographers
German people of Iranian descent
German people of Sinti descent
German rappers
Hip hop record producers
Living people
Masked musicians
Musicians from Berlin
Participants in the Bundesvision Song Contest
1980 births
German male non-fiction writers
MTV Europe Music Award winners
People from Reinickendorf